The Smolensk air disaster, which involved Polish Air Force Flight 101 in 2010 killed all 96 people on board, including Polish President Lech Kaczyński, his wife Maria Kaczyńska and dozens of other senior officials. The Polish delegation was heading to Katyn to attend a ceremony marking the 70th anniversary of the Katyn massacre, in which the Soviet NKVD killed about 22,000 Polish military officers.

Among those killed in the crash of Flight 101 were former President-in-exile Ryszard Kaczorowski, Poland's highest-ranking military officers, lawmakers, heads of the Polish National Bank and other central institutions, presidential aides, bishops and priests of various denominations, relatives of those killed in the Katyn massacre, as well as officers of the presidential security detail and crew members.


Fatalities

Posthumous recognition

Not on board 
Some early reports were wrong about the number or composition as the official list of victims was corrected in stages; most notably because the flight manifest of passengers only, without names of the crew, lacked the name of the only female member of the nine Biuro Ochrony Rządu (Government Protection Bureau bodyguards), Agnieszka Pogródka-Węcławek. She was listed incorrectly among the stewardesses. Also, a female presidential aide, Zofia Kruszyńska-Gust, was supposed to fly but did not do so due to illness.  Additionally, Michael Schudrich, the Chief Rabbi of Poland, was invited but did not board the flight due to its conflict with the Jewish Sabbath, which prohibits flight on Saturday.

References

External links
 Federacja Rodzin Katyńskich 
 National Katyn Memorial Foundation
 Text of President Kaczynski's planned speech commemorating Victims of the Katyn Forest Massacre

Lists of Polish people

casualties
Lists of victims